Lisičani is a village in the municipality of Plasnica, North Macedonia.

Demographics
Lisičani has traditionally been a Macedonian Muslim (Torbeš) village.

According to the 2002 census, the village had a total of 1153 inhabitants. Ethnic groups in the village include:

Turks 1126
Albanians 10
Macedonians 6 
Others 11

Sports
The local football team is FK Bratstvo Lisičani.

References

Villages in Plasnica Municipality
Macedonian Muslim villages
Turkish communities in North Macedonia